The 1999 Vuelta a Burgos was the 21st edition of the Vuelta a Burgos road cycling stage race, which was held from 16 August to 20 August 1999. The race started in Milagros and finished in Burgos. The race was won by Abraham Olano of the  team.

General classification

References

Vuelta a Burgos
1999 in Spanish road cycling
August 1999 sports events in Europe